Phil Rodgers (April 3, 1938 – June 26, 2018) was an American professional golfer.

Life
Rodgers was born in San Diego, California. He won the 1958 NCAA Division I Championship while playing at the University of Houston. Immediately after, he was placed in the first position on the first team of the 1958 All-American golf team, which included many well known professionals including future winners of the PGA Championship, Al Geiberger and Bobby Nichols and Masters Tournament winner, Tommy Aaron.

While in the Marine Corps, Rodgers won virtually every service tournament (he was even pulled out of Boot Camp to play in the All Services tournament), then turned professional in 1961. He won five times on the PGA Tour in the 1960s. Playing sparingly in 1961, but winning the "unofficial" 54-hole Sahara Pro-Am in Las Vegas, Nevada, Rodgers started his first full year on the PGA Tour in 1962, which began with the Los Angeles Open. Tied for the lead after 54 holes with Fred Hawkins at 206, Rodgers ran away from the field shooting a 9-under-par 62 making 9 birdies and 9 pars to win his first championship by 9 strokes.

He lost to Bob Charles in a 36-hole playoff in the 1963 Open Championship. Rodgers also lost the 1962 U.S. Open by two strokes despite going 6-over-par on two holes. In the first round, he took a quadruple bogey 8 on the 17th hole, and 4-putted the 12th hole in the third round. Still, after chipping in for a birdie on the 12th hole in the final round, he stood at 2-under-par with six holes left, needing 6 pars to win. Instead he made 3 bogeys enabling Arnold Palmer and Jack Nicklaus to finish regulation play tied for first at 1-under-par. Nicklaus went on to win the playoff and scored his first victory as a professional.

After a stint on the Senior PGA Tour, Rodgers became a much sought-after teacher, specializing in the short game. One of his first pupils was Jack Nicklaus, who publicly credited Rodgers with teaching him more precise wedge play which helped him win his fourth U.S. Open championship in 1980 at age 40. For several years, Golf Magazine ranked Rodgers in their top 100 teachers.

Rodgers died in San Diego on June 26, 2018 from leukemia at the age of 80.

Professional wins (6)

PGA Tour wins (5)

PGA Tour playoff record (0–2)

Other wins (1)
this list may be incomplete
1961 Sahara Pro-Am

Results in major championships

CUT = missed the half-way cut (3rd round cut in 1962 PGA Championship)
"T" indicates a tie for a place

Summary

Most consecutive cuts made – 4 (twice)
Longest streak of top-10s – 2 (twice)

References

External links

American male golfers
Houston Cougars men's golfers
PGA Tour golfers
PGA Tour Champions golfers
Golfers from San Diego
1938 births
2018 deaths